The Estremadura Limestone Massif is a massif located in central west Portugal. Approximately half of the massif is located within the Serras de Aire e Candeeiros Natural Park. The massif has an elongated NE-SW direction and englobes the municipalities of Batalha and Ourém in the north and northeast; Torres Novas and Alcanena in the east and southeast; Rio Maior in the south; and Alcobaça in the west.

References

Geologic formations of Portugal